Euchontha carboniptera is a moth of the family Notodontidae first described by James S. Miller in 2008. It is endemic to the eastern slopes of the Peruvian Andes.

The length of the forewings is 13–14 mm for males. The ground color of the forewings is dark
charcoal gray to black. The ground color of the hindwings is dark gray to blackish charcoal gray.

Etymology
The name combines carbo which is Latin for coal with the Greek pteron (meaning wing) and refers to the coal-black ground color of the forewings and hindwings, which distinguishes it from all other members of the genus Euchontha.

References

Moths described in 2008
Notodontidae of South America